The 2015–16 Welsh Alliance League, known as the Lock Stock Welsh Alliance League for sponsorship reasons, is the 32nd season of the Welsh Alliance League, which consists of two divisions: the third and fourth levels of the Welsh football pyramid.

There are sixteen teams in Division 1 and thirteen teams in Division 2. The bottom team of Division 1 is relegated to Division 2 and in Division 2, the champions and runners-up are promoted to Division 1.

The season began on 8 August 2015 and concluded on 28 May 2016 with Trearddur Bay as Division 1 champions and Llanfairpwll were relegated to Division 2. In Division 2, Greenfield were champions with Nantlle Vale as runners-up. Both teams were promoted to Division 1.

Division 1

Teams
Holywell Town were champions in the previous season and were promoted to the Cymru Alliance. They were replaced by St Asaph City, Llangefni Town and Trearddur Bay, who were Division 2 champions, second and third place runners-ups, respectively from the previous season were promoted to Division 1.

Grounds and locations

League table

Results

Division 2

Teams
St Asaph City were champions in the previous season and were promoted to Division 1 along with runners-ups, Llangefni Town and Trearddur Bay. They were replaced by Gwynedd League champions, Llanllyfni and Vale of Clwyd and Conwy Football League champions, Prestatyn Sports were promoted to Division 2.

Grounds and locations

League table

Results

References

Welsh Alliance League seasons
Wales
2015–16 in Welsh football